Law of adoption may refer to

Adoption
Adoption law
Law of adoption (Mormonism)
Christian law of adoption in India
LGBT adoption (section Summary of laws by jurisdiction)
LGBT adoption and parenting in Australia
LGBT adoption in the United States
LGBT rights in the United States (section State adoption laws)
International adoption (section International adoption laws)
Adoption Information Disclosure Act
Adoption and Safe Families Act US 1997
China Center of Adoption Affairs
Uniform Adoption Act US 1994
Adoption in Australia (section State laws)
Adoption in California (section California adoption law)
Adoption in Guatemala